The National Electronics Museum, located in Linthicum, Maryland, displays the history of the United States defense electronics. The museum houses exhibits containing assortments of telegraphs, radios, radars and satellites. Located near the Baltimore/Washington International Airport and rail station, the museum displays hands-on electronics. The library serves as a research center open to the public. In addition, an amateur radio station is broadcast live from the museum each week. K3NEM/W3GR includes both antique and updated communication equipment.

History 
The National Electronics Museum was created by Westinghouse employees. Robert L. Dwight, who worked for the Westinghouse Defense and Electronics Systems Center located in Baltimore, MD, jump-started the current collection in 1973 by conducting a "Family Day" to display his colleagues' work while involving their families. Titled "Yesterday, Today, and Tomorrow", the exhibit showed examples of past and present Westinghouse work to represent the company's progress through the eras.

Dwight then decided to pursue more radar systems and other electronics for viewing. His first mission, taken on with the help of Jack Sun, a former U.S. Air Force officer and Westinghouse employee, was to acquire the BOMARC missile radar from the Department of Defense. This missile housed the first airborne pulse-doppler radar, AN/DPN-53. However, in order to gain access to the radar they had to be classified as a non-profit museum.

After gaining advice and paperwork from Westinghouse lawyer, Butch Gregory, they founded the National Electronics Museum in 1980.

Formerly run by volunteers, the museum hired its first professional employee in 1989 and subsequently relocated to Friendship Square in 1992.

In 1996, Northrop Grumman bought Westinghouse and continued support for museum efforts. This space included a conference room, event hall, gallery, and a climate-controlled warehouse.

The museum offers education programs such as YESS (Young Engineers and Scientists) and the annual Robot Fest (held annually on the last weekend of April), as well as the Robert L. Dwight scholarship. Donations and grants are accepted from foundations and engineering societies.
Board members include former Westinghouse employees and Northrop Grumman associates. Other public foundations such as Anne Arundel County Public Schools, Camegie Institute, American Alliance of Museums, the University of Maryland – Baltimore County, Johns Hopkins Applied Physics Lab, Allied Signal, and Hertzbach & Company support the museum. Over 30 volunteers donate over 5,000 hours of their time each year.

Galleries 

The National Electronics Museum is organized into twelve related exhibit galleries:

Fundamentals Gallery- Focuses on the basics of electricity and electronics as well as early electronics
Communications Gallery- From the telegraph to modern computers, this gallery focuses on a wide range of communication devices, including Ham Radio and the Enigma Machine.
Early Radar Gallery- Radar from World War II, to the include the actual SCR-270 unit used at the Opana Radar Site on December 7, 1941. 
Cold War Radar Gallery- The Cold War advanced technology in many areas, including radar.
Modern Radar Gallery- Radar has continued to develop, as is shown in this gallery
Countermeasures Gallery- As Radar has developed, so have ways to hide from it, including jammers, receivers, and transmitters.
Under Seas Gallery – Focuses on SONAR as well as other underwater technology
Electro-optical Gallery – Focuses on the basics of infrared versus visual and the applications of infrared and Electro-optical technology
Space Sensor Gallery – From satellites to the cameras used on the moon, this gallery looks at the technologies that have been used outside our planet
Temporary Gallery – The museum has gallery space that changes regularly.
Outside Gallery – Six Historic radar Antennas, spanning 75 years of radar development, stand around the museum.

Events 
RobotFest – held at the museum annually
Pioneer Camp – held at the museum each summer

See also
 List of museums in Maryland

References

External links 

 The National Electronics Museum
 Amateur Radio Club of the National Electronics Museum
 
 
 What’s New (Old) at the National Electronics Museum? – IEEE Microwave magazine

Libraries in Maryland
Linthicum, Maryland
Science museums in Maryland
Museums established in 1980
Military and war museums in Maryland
Museums in Anne Arundel County, Maryland
Telecommunications museums in the United States
1980 establishments in Maryland